Philip, son of Menelaus was a Macedonian general of Alexander from the beginning of the Asiatic expedition. In the battle of Granicus (334 BC) he commanded the allied cavalry from Peloponnesus. In the battle of Gaugamela (331 BC) the Thessalian cavalry.

References
Who's who in the age of Alexander the Great  Page 212  

Ancient Macedonian generals
4th-century BC Greek people